Susanne Schödel  (pronunciation Suza:nne Shœdel) is a multi World Record holder and Women World champion glider sport pilot.

Biography 
A former windsurfer, Susanne Schödel began flying in her 20s. She holds a pilot license for engine-powered aircraft.  Soaring in sync with wind and thermals gives her the opportunity to optimize her skills and techniques, either during relaxing weekends, in contests   or when record flying. A long-time sustainer of the practice, earlier on as flight trainer, at AeroClub Langenselbold, German Aero Club, Susanne continued as member of the national aviation sport team in displays of performance; as a team member as well as solo participant at cross-country flying,  Women's gliding championships  and events, Gliding competition, which performance vary from aerobatic  gliding among the FAI Glider competition classes acknowledged and suitable for competitions.

Career 
Schödel has an academic background in Political Science.  Her professional career spans various sectors, from being Managing Director at Susan G. Komen for the Cure e.V. Germany, to public sector, having worked for governmental institutions in Germany.

From 2014 to 2019 Susanne Schödel held the position Secretary General of Fédération Aéronautique Internationale, World Air Sports Federation (FAI).

Records 
Susanne Schödel was German Women's Champion in 2010, and Women's World Champion in 2009 and 2011, flying Schempp-Hirth Ventus-2. 
The following table lists Susanne Schödel's FAI records  accomplished in Africa, flying Schempp-Hirth aircraft (Schempp-Hirth Arcus, Schempp-Hirth Ventus-2, Schempp-Hirth Nimbus-4) while stationed at Bitterwasser airfield in Namibia.

The geography and geology of the Kalahari Desert and this part of Africa, create unique conditions for thermals, which allow the naturally powered gliders to fly at higher altitudes, for longer length of time, at various velocities. For record flights established a tree is planted in the area, traditionally a palm tree with plate.

References 

Living people
German aviation record holders
German women aviators
Air sports
1973 births
Glider pilots
German women aviation record holders